David Thomas Hughes (born 19 March 1958) is an English former footballer who made 87 appearances in the Football League playing for Aston Villa, Lincoln City and Scunthorpe United, before moving into non-league football with Worcester City. He played as a midfielder.

References

1958 births
Living people
Footballers from Birmingham, West Midlands
English footballers
Association football midfielders
Aston Villa F.C. players
Lincoln City F.C. players
Scunthorpe United F.C. players
Worcester City F.C. players
English Football League players
National League (English football) players